Andy Martin is a musician, lyricist and writer who lives in London.

The 1980s
During the 1980s, he was the singer, lyricist and occasionally drummer for The Apostles, a group that was founded in 1979 by four North London schoolboys, William 'Bill' Corbett, Julian Portinari, Dan Macintyre and Pete Byng-Hall and played a prominent part in the anarcho-punk scene in London. Some of the band's recordings appeared on the record label Mortarhate run by the group Conflict; other recordings, many on cassette, were released by The Apostles themselves.

Members of the group published their own zine called Scum, and the Anarchist Precautions essentialles pour la bonne. During this period Martin and various associates, including at times members of the band Crass, helped run several different anarchist venues in London for performances, films and meetings, including "The Autonomy Centre" and "The Zig-Zag Club".  During the time he was with The Apostles, Martin began to express his views about his own homosexuality and the topic in general in his lyrics for the band, emerging as a forerunner for the nascent Queercore scene. The Apostles, as well as Martin's next band, Academy 23, were both on the J.D.s Top Ten Tape, the first queercore compilation, issued by J.D.s zine in 1990, and were interviewed in Homocore zine.

During the 1980s Martin and fellow Apostle Dave Fanning had sought to go far beyond the typical manner of releasing records. Each of their releases came with booklets or pamphlets written by Martin and artwork and comics by Fanning. Eventually they ceased to perform live in order to concentrate on this aspect of the band. Disillusioned with the punk scene, their interests in art and in other forms of music such as folk and industrial began to surface.

The 1990s

In 1990, The Apostles changed their name to Academy 23, and at the same time changed directions musically and philosophically. The band became more involved in cassette culture and collaborated with Industrial band The Grey Wolves on a couple of recordings. Moving away from their earlier punk sound, they successfully merged folk and industrial elements, and in the process became one of the early creators of the genre that would come to be called neo-folk. Frequently recording in other languages such as German, they became popular in continental Europe.

Also in 1990, Martin began a collaboration with Peter Williams, who later joined Academy 23, in a band they named Time To Think, releasing several cassettes and a 7-inch EP on Williams' label Thinking Time.

From 1992 till 2001, Martin wrote for and edited 26 issues of the non-commercial art magazine SMILE, an internationally edited publication first launched by Stewart Home in February 1984.

2000s
At the end of the nineties, Academy 23 changed names once again, this time to Unit, for which Martin continues to perform and write. His constant collaborator through all three bands has been Dave Fanning.

Publications
 Scum
 SMILE, 1992–2001, editor

References

External links
Official "Unit" site, featuring essays by Andy Martin
The Apostles history essay on the "Unit" site, by Andy Martin
"Anarchy, punkrock and The Apostles" by Andy Martin
"Anarchy, Punk Rock and The Apostles" by Andy Martin (above link appears to be broken)

English punk rock drummers
English punk rock singers
Anarcho-punk musicians
Year of birth missing (living people)
Living people
English gay musicians
English anarchists